The Kolubara District is one of eight administrative districts of Šumadija and Western Serbia. It occupies the central part of western Serbia. According to the 2011 census results, it has a population of 174,513 inhabitants. The administrative center of the Kolubara District is Valjevo, on the banks of the Kolubara River.

Municipalities
The district encompasses the municipalities of:
 Osečina
 Ub
 Lajkovac
 Valjevo
 Mionica
 Ljig

Demographics

According to the last official census done in 2011, the Kolubara District has 174,513 inhabitants. Ethnic composition of the district:

Culture
This region is distinguished for its cultural-historic monuments: the Muselim's Palace, a typical example of the Turkish architecture built in the thirteenth century, the Tower of the Nenadovic Family, built in 1813 by Duke Janko, the church of Valjevo originating from 1838 which is a rare example of monumental classicistic style building in Serbia.

Tourism
The major tourism resorts in the district are: the Divčibare and the Vrujci Spa.

See also
 Administrative divisions of Serbia
 Districts of Serbia

References

Note: ''All official material made by Government of Serbia is public by law. Information was taken from {{url|https://web.archive.org/web/20090221052324/http://www.srbija.gov.rs/%7D%7D.%27%27

External links

 

 
Districts of Šumadija and Western Serbia